Véronique Ançay-Carron, née Ançay (born 1970), from Fully is a Swiss ski mountaineer. She also takes part in mountain bike and ultramarathon competitions.

Selected results 
 2000:
 1st, Patrouille de la Maya A-course, together with Nicole Gillioz and Christine Luyet
 2001:
 1st, Tour du Rutor (together with Catherine Mabillard)
 3rd, Trophée des Gastlosen (European Cup, together with Christine Luyet)
 7th, European Championship team race (together with Christine Luyet)
 2002:
 1st, Patrouille de la Maya A-course, together with Catherine Mabillard and Anne Bochatay
 1st, Diamir Race Diemigtal Swiss Cup race (together with Catherine Mabillard)
 3rd, Valerette Altiski 2000 Swiss Cup race 
 2004:
 1st, Patrouille de la Maya A-course, together with Chantal Daucourt and Mary-Jérôme Vaudan
 2008:
 1st, Patrouille de la Maya A-course, together with Mary-Jérôme Vaudan and Anne Bochatay
 2009:
 3rd, Trophée des Gastlosen (together with Valérie Berthod-Pellissier)

Patrouille des Glaciers 

 2002: 2nd, together with Nicole Gillioz and Christine Luyet
 2004: 3rd, together with Chantal Daucourt and Mary-Jérôme Vaudan
 2008: 5th (and 1st in the "civilian women" ranking), together with Anne Bochatay and Mary-Jérôme Vaudan
 2010: 6th (and 3rd in the "civilian women" ranking), together with Mary-Jérôme Vaudan and Valérie Berthod-Pélissier

Pierra Menta 

 1999: 4th, together with Catherine Mabillard
 2001, 3rd, together with Nicole Gillioz
 2005: 6th, together with Nathalie Blanc

Trofeo Mezzalama 

 2011: 10th, together with Valérie Berthod-Pellissier and Mary-Jérôme Vaudan

External links 
 Personnel website

References 

1970 births
Living people
Swiss female ski mountaineers